Robert Emmett Finn (June 10, 1877 – February 23, 1951) was a lawyer and political figure in Nova Scotia, Canada. He represented Halifax County in the Nova Scotia House of Assembly from 1906 to 1922 and Halifax in the House of Commons of Canada from 1922 to 1925 and from 1936 to 1940 as a Liberal member.

He was born in Dartmouth, Nova Scotia, the son of John Finn and Mary Farrell, of Irish descent. Finn moved to Halifax while still young. He was educated at Dalhousie University, was called to the bar and set up practice in Halifax. In 1902, Finn married Anna Louise Russell. He served as president of the Charitable Irish Society. Finn was a war correspondent with the Canadian contingent during the Second Boer War in South Africa. He served as a minister without portfolio in the province's Executive Council from 1918 to 1922. He resigned his seat in the provincial assembly to run for a federal seat in 1922. Finn was defeated when he ran for reelection to the House of Commons in 1925 and 1940.

References 

 
 

1877 births
1951 deaths
Nova Scotia Liberal Party MLAs
Liberal Party of Canada MPs
Members of the House of Commons of Canada from Nova Scotia